Yefim Alekseevich Pridvorov (– May 25, 1945), better known by the pen name Demyan Bedny (Damian the Poor), was a Soviet Russian poet, Bolshevik propagandist and satirist.

Life
Efim Pridvorov was born to a poor family in Hubivka village, in Kherson Governorate, present-day Ukraine.  At the age of seven, his father took him to live in Elizavetgrad, but six years later was sent back to his home village to live with his mother "in extreme poverty". When he was 14, his father secured him a paid-for place in a feldsher training college in Kyiv. This was followed by four years of military service. In 1904, he entered the philological and historical faculty of Petersburg University. His university years coincided with the heady times of the 1905 Revolution, and Pridvorov, like most students, became an ardent supporter of the revolution. From 1911 he began to be published in communist newspapers, such as Pravda, and in 1912 he joined the Russian Social Democratic Labour Party (Bolsheviks). Also in 1911, he published the poem "Of Demyan Bedny", which led to him being known by that name, and began a private correspondence with Vladimir Lenin which was said to develop into a long-lasting personal friendship. His first collected works were published in Basni (Fables) in 1913. During World War I, he once again saw service as a feldsher and was decorated.

He was a steadfast supporter of the Bolshevik cause throughout the Russian Revolution and Civil War, writing agitprop from the frontlines. Arthur Ransome described him in 1919 as "fatter than he used to be (admirers from the country send him food) with a round face, shrewd laughing eyes, and cynical mouth, a typical peasant." He was decorated with the Order of the Red Banner in 1923, followed by the Order of Lenin in 1933. In the 1920s and 1930s, he was very popular and variously supported by the Soviet regime. The town of Spassk, Penza Oblast was even renamed Bednodemyanovsk in his honour. He was the only writer to be allocated rooms in the Kremlin. His first political setback came in December 1930, when two of his historical poems were censured by the Central Committee. He wrote a plaintive letter to Stalin asking, and received a long reply accusing him of having insulted the Russian working class. Stalin also disliked a play that Bedny had written in 1932 about the Red Army, calling it "mediocre".

In September 1932, due to a report stating Bedny's debauched life during a CPSU Poliburo meeting, Stalin decided to evict Bedny from his Kremlin apartment. He was relocated to Rozhdestvensky Boulevard, which he called a rat's barn. He told the poet Osip Mandelstam that he had been reported by a secretary who had heard him complain that Stalin left grubby finger marks on books borrowed from Bedny's private library,  but it appears that Bedny's real offence was that his writings were highly critical of Russia's imperialist past, whereas Stalin, though he was not a Russian, "nevertheless grasped that Russian nationalism was the glue that held the Soviet Union together". In November 1936 the Politburo condemned Bedny's opera The Bogatyrs for its "antihistorical and mocking depiction of Old Russia's acceptance of Christianity." He tried to regain favour with verses virulently attacking prominent victims of the Great Purge. His poem published in Pravda on 21 August 1936, to mark the show trial of Grigori Zinoviev and others, was headed 'No Mercy'. On 12 June 1937, he published a 54 line poem celebrating the previous day's announcement that Marshal Tukhachevsky and other Red Army commanders had been arrested, which included all of their names in a rhyming scheme. Nonetheless, in 1938 Bedny was stripped of membership in the Communist Party and the Union of Soviet Writers, and in 1941, Stalin remarked to Georgi Dimitrov "ten volumes of verse by Demyan Bedny are not worth one poem of Mayakovsky's" but slowly he regained the favour of Stalin through the years of World War II. His poem commemorating the Soviet victory was published in Pravda on May 3, 1945. Bedny died two weeks later, on May 19.

Trivia
Bedny's caustic anti-religious poem New Testament without defects (Новый Завет без изъяна) may have inspired Mikhail Bulgakov's The Master and Margarita as a rebuttal. In addition, his character was a prototype for Mikhail Berlioz and Bezdomny (Homeless) was a parody on Bedny's pseudonym. Bulgakov did not normally take pleasure in hearing that someone had been denounced, but made an exception when Bedny ran into trouble in 1938. "He's not going to be chortling over anyone else. Let him feel it for himself," he said.
Bedny attended the execution of Socialist-Revolutionary Fanny Kaplan, who was convicted for attempting to kill Lenin, "for artistic inspiration", but according to witnesses he felt sick once the Chekists started burning Kaplan's disfigured corpse.
Bedny amassed one of the largest private libraries in the Soviet Union (over 30.000 volumes), from which Stalin was known to borrow books on occasion.
According to Nikita Khrushchev's memoirs, Bedny was his favourite poet.

Sources

External links and references
Demyan Bedny. Poems
Several biographical sketches (in Russian)
Biography (in Russian)

1883 births
1945 deaths
People from Kirovohrad Oblast
People from Aleksandriysky Uyezd
Russian Social Democratic Labour Party members
Old Bolsheviks
Expelled members of the Communist Party of the Soviet Union
Book and manuscript collectors
Ukrainian poets
Soviet poets
Ukrainian male poets
Soviet male writers
20th-century male writers
Soviet propagandists
Ukrainian atheists
Russian military personnel of World War I
Saint Petersburg State University alumni
Recipients of the Order of Lenin
Recipients of the Order of the Red Banner
Burials at Novodevichy Cemetery
20th-century pseudonymous writers